Irma Carmona Zárate (born November 28, 1960 in Mexico City), better known as Irma Carmona, is a Mexican voice actress known for voicing Sailor Neptune in Sailor Moon. She was also the voice of female Ranma in Ranma ½.

Filmography

Sister Bear in The Berenstain Bears
Lala in Ojamajo Doremi (1999–2003)
Michelle Kaio/Sailor Neptune in Sailor Moon S (1997–1998), Sailor Moon Stars (1999), Sailor Moon S: Hearts In Ice (1998), and Sailor Moon SuperS: The Black Dream Hole (1999)
Estudiante in Sailor Moon R: The Promise of the Rose (1997)
Computer #1 in Ghost in the Shell (1996)
Shazara in Dangaioh (1996)
Ranma Saotome (female) in Ranma ½ (1993–1997)
Bunnie Rabbot in Sonic SatAM
Cecilia in Peter Pan and the Pirates
Monica in The Adventures of Pete and Pete

References

External links
 Interview (in Spanish)

Living people
Mexican voice actresses
1960 births
Actresses from Mexico City